Kinda Funny is an online entertainment company that produces videos and podcasts on video game culture, film, television, and comics.

Kinda Funny creates content on two YouTube channels: The primary Kinda Funny channel features comedy videos such as Kinda Funny: The Animated Series, as well as Kinda Funny's flagship podcast 'The Kinda Funny Podcast' (formerly 'The GameOverGreggy Show'). While Kinda Funny Games is the company's video game arm focusing on Let's Plays and weekly podcast The Kinda Funny Gamescast. Since June 19, 2017, the Kinda Funny Games arm of the company has produced a live, daily, video games news podcast for YouTube and Twitch, under the name "Kinda Funny Games Daily".

History

IGN editors Greg Miller and Colin Moriarty created The GameOverGreggy Show in 2013 as a side project, following the popularity of A Conversation With Colin on Greg's personal YouTube channel, GameOverGreggy. Video producers Nick Scarpino and Tim Gettys, also from IGN, later joined the team. In fall of 2014, they launched a Patreon for the channel and rebranded it as Kinda Funny. They received $10,000 in funding within the first 24 hours.

On January 5, 2015, the Kinda Funny team left IGN to start their own entertainment venture, which would allow them to cover video game topics that had previously been off limits to Kinda Funny due to their conditions with IGN. The new company was funded primarily through viewer support and crowdfunding on Patreon.

The channel covers games, film, television, and comics, as was covered at IGN, but often touches on other topics such as politics and snack foods. Their crowdfunding had raised $30,000 in the months leading up to their decision, and $10,000 the day of their announcement. Soon after, they raised close to $35,000 a month between two Patreon accounts. Ben Kuchera of Polygon viewed the news as evidence that fan-funded content had reached new levels, and remarked that content-creators served to make more money when fans paid creators directly rather than the creators using advertising to raise money from fans. The team also continued to freelance for IGN after they left.

On March 30, 2016, Kinda Funny formed a partnership with Rooster Teeth by joining the LetsPlay Network and now occasionally appear in video content on the LetsPlay channel, as well as selling merchandise through the Rooster Teeth online store and participate in LetsPlay events.

New Kinda Funny content featured during one of GameSpot two stage shows at the 2016 Electronic Entertainment Expo. 

On March 13, 2017, Colin Moriarty announced his resignation from the company following outcry over a controversial joke posted on Twitter, citing a difference in creative vision with the rest of the Kinda Funny co-founders.

In January 2019, Kinda Funny announced Kinda Funny 4.0. This included the end of The Morning Show and the beginning of many new weekly shows. These include Internet Explorerz, KF/AF, Screencast, Party Mode, and Debatable. The group also retooled their podcast lineup; most notably they retired the long running GameOverGreggy Podcast and replaced it with The Kinda Funny Podcast. The Kinda Funny initiative was kicked off with a month long Patreon fundraiser drive.

Shows 
Shows include:

General 
 Kinda Funny In Review
 Kinda Funny Morning Show
 KF/AF
 We Have Cool Friends
 Internet Explorerz
 NickNames
 Screencast
 The Kinda Funny Podcast
 Greg's Comic Book Club
 Love, Sex, & Stuff (formerly known as Love & Sex Stuff)
 Cooking with Greggy
 Debatable
 Kinda Funny Doodles
 Kinda Funny: The Animated Series

Gaming related 
 PS I Love You XOXO
 Kinda Funny Games Daily
 Kinda Funny Xcast
 Party Mode
 A Conversation With Colin Was Right
 Kinda Funny Gamescast
 The PlayStation VR Show
 Kinda Funny Reacts
 Kinda Funny First Impressions

References

External links

 

American YouTubers
Twitch (service) streamers
American comedy websites
Video game journalism
American companies established in 2015
IGN